Osijek Pride is an LGBT pride march in the Croatian city of Osijek. Osijek is the third city in Croatia to get its LGBT pride, after Zagreb (2002) and Split (2011). The first Osijek Pride took place on 6 September 2014.

History

References

Recurring events established in 2014
2014 establishments in Croatia
Pride parades in Croatia
Culture in Osijek